Live Evolution 8701 is a video album by Usher. It was released on November 12, 2002, by LaFace Records and includes all of Usher's top hits up to that time in his career.

Track listing

Bonus features
Rehearsal Song-U Don't Have To Call
Usher's Bio Video
Biography & Discography
Photo Gallery

Personnel
Credits for Live Evolution 8701 adapted from Allmusic.

 Brian Casey - Composer
 Jermaine Dupri - Composer
 C.D. Hawkins - Composer
 Usher Raymond - Composer
 Manuel Seal, Jr. - Composer
 J. Karen Thomas - Composer

Certifications

References

Usher (musician) video albums
2002 live albums